The 2013 Soul Train Music Awards ceremony took place on December 1, 2013 at the Orleans Arena in Paradise, Nevada and was hosted by comedian and actor Anthony Anderson. The ceremony was aired on BET and Centric and included special tributes to Dionne Warwick, who received the Soul Train Legend Award and Keith Sweat given the Lifetime Achievement Award.

Tamar Braxton and Robin Thicke took the lead as the big winner's during the ceremony; including Braxton taking Record of the Year and Thicke taking Song of the Year.

Special awards

Lifetime Achievement Award
 Keith Sweat

Legend Award
 Dionne Warwick

Winners and nominees
Winners are in bold text.

Album of the Year
 Kendrick Lamar – Good Kid, M.A.A.D City
 Fantasia – Side Effects of You
 Jay Z – Magna Carta Holy Grail
 Miguel – Kaleidoscope Dream
 Rihanna – Unapologetic
 Justin Timberlake – The 20/20 Experience

Song of the Year
 Robin Thicke  – "Blurred Lines"
 Tamar Braxton – "Love and War"
 Chris Brown – "Fine China"
 Kendrick Lamar  – "Poetic Justice"
 Rihanna – "Diamonds"
 Justin Timberlake  – "Suit & Tie"

Video of the Year
 Janelle Monáe  – "Q.U.E.E.N."
 Tamar Braxton – "Love and War"
 Chris Brown – "Fine China"
 Drake – "Started from the Bottom"
 Kendrick Lamar  – "Poetic Justice"
 Robin Thicke  – "Blurred Lines"

The Ashford & Simpson Songwriter's Award
 Tamar Braxton – "Love and War"
 Written by: Tamar Braxton, Darhyl Camper Jr., LaShawn Daniels and Makeba Riddick
 Fantasia – "Lose to Win"
 Written by: Franne Golde, Dennis Lambert, Andrea Martin, Walter Orange and Harmony Samuels
 J. Cole – "Crooked Smile"
 Written by: Jermaine Cole and Meleni Smith
 Alicia Keys  – "Fire We Make"
 Written by: Gary Clark Jr., Warren Felder, Alicia Keys and Andrew Wansel
 Janelle Monáe  – "Q.U.E.E.N."
 Written by: Roman GianArthur Irvin, Dr. Nathaniel Irvin III, Charles Joseph II, Janelle Monáe Robinson and Kellis Parker Jr.
 Justin Timberlake – "Mirrors"
 Written by: James Fauntleroy, Jerome Harmon, Timothy Mosley and Justin Timberlake

Best R&B/Soul Male Artist
 Miguel
 Chris Brown
 John Legend
 Bruno Mars
 Robin Thicke
 Charlie Wilson

Best R&B/Soul Female Artist (The Chaka Khan Award for Best R&B/Soul Female)
 Tamar Braxton
 Fantasia
 Alicia Keys
 Chrisette Michele
 Janelle Monáe
 Kelly Rowland

Best New Artist
 K. Michelle
 Tamar Braxton
 Bridget Kelly
 Kendrick Lamar
 TGT

Centric Award
 Luke James
 Stacy Barthe
 Lyfe Jennings
 Talib Kweli
 Solange
 Joss Stone

Best Gospel/Inspirational Performance
 Tye Tribbett – "If He Did It Before (Same God)"
 Tasha Cobbs – "Break Every Chain"
 LeCrae – "Confessions"
 Hezekiah Walker – "Every Praise"
 Shirley Caesar – "God Will Make a Way"
 John P. Kee – "Life & Favor"

Best Hip-Hop Song of the Year
 Wale  – "Bad"
 Drake – "Started from the Bottom"
 J. Cole  – "Power Trip"
 Jay Z  – "Holy Grail"
 Kendrick Lamar  – "Poetic Justice"
 Nicki Minaj  – "High School"

Best Dance Performance
 Ciara – "Body Party"
 Chris Brown – "Fine China"
 Bruno Mars – "Treasure"
 Janelle Monáe  – "Q.U.E.E.N."
 Robin Thicke  – "Blurred Lines"
 Justin Timberlake  – "Suit & Tie"

Best Collaboration
 Robin Thicke  – "Blurred Lines"
 Brandy  – "Put It Down"
 J. Cole  – "Power Trip"
 Alicia Keys  – "Fire We Make"
 Miguel  – "How Many Drinks?"
 Janelle Monáe  – "Q.U.E.E.N."
 Wale  – "LoveHate Thing"

CENTRICTV.com Awards

Best Independent R&B/Soul Performance
 Ashanti – "Never Should Have"
 Raheem DeVaughn – "A Place Called Love Land"
 Ronald Isley – "Dinner and a Movie"
 Kenny Lattimore – "Find a Way"
 Maysa Leak – "Love Me Good"
 Brian McKnight – "Sweeter"

Best International Performance
 Bunji Garlin – "Differentology"
 Iyanya – "Ur Waist"
 Machel Montano – "Bend Over"
 P-Square – "Personally"
 Emeli Sandé – "Next to Me"

Best Traditional Jazz Artist/Group
 Nicole Henry – "Waiting in Vain"
 Tony Bennett  – "For Once in My Life"
 George Benson  – "Unforgettable"
 Terence Blanchard – "Pet Step Sitter's Theme Song"
 Jeffrey Osborne  – "Baby, It's Cold Outside"

Best Contemporary Jazz Artist/Group
 George Duke – "Missing You"
 Michael Bublé – "It's A Beautiful Day"
 Boney James  – "Batucada (The Beat)"
 José James – "Trouble"
 Dave Koz – "Got to Get You into My Life"

Performers
 Jennifer Hudson
 Chaka Khan
 Evelyn "Champagne" King
 K. Michelle
 Jon B.
 Dave Koz
 Vanilla Ice
 T.I.
 Wale
 Tamar Braxton
 Bobby Caldwell
 Doug E. Fresh
 Slick Rick
 Big Daddy Kane
 Warren G
 Smokey Robinson

Tribute performers
 Keith Sweat Tribute
 Keith Sweat
 Faith Evans

Keith Sweat performed in honor of his own tribute; a medley of his most popular songs, also a duet with Faith Evans for his song "Make It Last Forever".

 Dionne Warwick Tribute
 Ron Isley
 Chrisette Michele
 Ruben Studdard
 Candice Glover
 Gladys Knight 
 Eric Benét
 Eddie Levert
 Kenny Lattimore
 Bobby V

Telecast
The Soul Train Awards were aired on BET and Centric on December 1, 2013.

References

External links
 Winner's List: 2013 Soul Train Music Awards
 2013 Soul Train Awards Nominees

Soul Train Music Awards
Soul
Soul
Soul
Soul
Soul Train Music Awards 2013